Clive Stuart Anderson (born 10 December 1952) is an English television and radio presenter, comedy writer, and former barrister. Winner of a British Comedy Award in 1991, Anderson began experimenting with comedy and writing comedic scripts during his 15-year legal career, before starring in Whose Line Is It Anyway? on BBC Radio 4, then later Channel 4. He has also hosted many radio programmes, and made guest appearances on Have I Got News for You, Mock the Week and QI.

Early life 
Anderson's mother was English and his parents met while serving in the RAF. He was educated at Stanburn Primary School and Harrow County School for Boys then a grammar school which closed in 1975. His group of contemporaries included Geoffrey Perkins and Michael Portillo. His Scottish father originally from Glasgow was promoted to manager of the Bradford & Bingley's Building Society, Wembley branch. Anderson attended Selwyn College, Cambridge, where, from 1974 to 1975, he was President of the Cambridge Footlights. He was called to the bar at the Middle Temple in 1976 and became a practising barrister, specialising in criminal law. While still practising law, he continued performing, including taking a show to the Edinburgh Fringe in 1981 with Griff Rhys Jones.

Career

Television
Anderson was involved in the fledgling alternative comedy scene in the early 1980s and was the first act to come on stage at The Comedy Store when it opened in 1979. He made his name as host of the UK version of the improvised television comedy show Whose Line Is It Anyway?, which ran for 10 series.

Anderson hosted his own chat show, Clive Anderson Talks Back (1989–1996), on Channel 4, which ran for 10 series. Anderson moved to the BBC in 1996. After moving to BBC One, the show's name was changed to Clive Anderson All Talk (1996–2001), and it ran for five series. In one incident in 1997, Anderson interviewed the Bee Gees. Throughout the interview, he repeatedly joked about their songs from the Saturday Night Fever era, also referring to their original intended name as 'Les Tosseurs' but his comment, 'you'll always be Les tossers to me' ultimately prompted the band to walk out of the interview. Anderson once had a glass of water poured over his head by a perturbed Richard Branson, to which Anderson remarked "I'm used to that; I've flown Virgin". Alluding to the singer and actress Cher's alleged cosmetic surgery when she was a guest on the show, he asked her "You look like a million dollars – is that how much it cost?" He also said to Jeffrey Archer in response to his derogatory comment about the show, "you're a critic too... there's no beginning to your talents". Archer retorted that "The old ones are always the best," for Anderson to reply "Yes, I've read your books."

He has made ten appearances on Have I Got News for You. He has also frequently appeared on QI. In 2007, he featured as a regular panellist on the ITV comedy show News Knight. One heated exchange on Have I Got News for You occurred when he joked to fellow guest Piers Morgan that the Daily Mirror was now, thanks to Morgan (then its editor), almost as good as The Sun. When asked by Morgan, "What do you know about editing newspapers?" he swiftly replied, "About as much as you do." From 2019 to 2020 he co-hosted the television series Mystic Britain on the Sky television channel Smithsonian. https://www.imdb.com/title/tt10613532/

In 2005, he presented the short-lived quiz Back in the Day for Channel 4. On 25 February 2008, he started to present Brainbox Challenge, a new game show, for BBC Two. Later that year, he presented a talent show-themed reality TV series produced by the BBC entitled Maestro, starring eight celebrities. In 2009, Anderson was the television host of the BBC's Last Night of the Proms.

Appearances

Radio

Anderson presents legal show Unreliable Evidence on Radio 4. He also covered the Sunday morning 11 a.m. to 1 p.m. show on BBC Radio 2 through the end of January 2008.

A radio version of the TV series Whose Line is it Anyway? was also broadcast on BBC Radio 4.

It was announced in April 2008 that Anderson, who had previously filled in for host Ned Sherrin from 2006 until Sherrin's death in 2007, would be taking over as permanent host of Loose Ends. He also hosted six series of Clive Anderson's Chat Room on BBC Radio 2 from 2004 to 2009. Anderson has appeared on BBC Radio 4's The Unbelievable Truth hosted by David Mitchell.

Anderson also presented the radio show The Guessing Game on BBC Radio Scotland. Anderson has also appeared on BBC Radio 5 Live's Fighting Talk.

Comedy and newspaper writing
Anderson is a comedy sketch writer who has written for Frankie Howerd, Not the Nine O'Clock News, and Griff Rhys Jones and Mel Smith. One of his early comedy writing projects was Black Cinderella Two Goes East with Rory McGrath for BBC Radio 4 in 1978. As well as writing comedy, Anderson is also a frequent contributor to newspapers and was a regular columnist for The Sunday Correspondent.

Personal life
Anderson lives in Highbury, North London, with his consultant wife, Jane Anderson, a physician who has spent her career in managing HIV/AIDS.

He supports Arsenal, and Rangers football teams. He is President of the Woodland Trust and became Vice Patron of the Solicitors' Benevolent Association, a registered charity.

Awards
The show Whose Line is it Anyway? won a BAFTA award in 1990. Later, Anderson won both the "Top Entertainment Presenter" and "Top Radio Comedy Personality" at the British Comedy Awards in 1991.

References

External links

Representation at Curtis Brown Talent Agency

1952 births
Living people
Alumni of Selwyn College, Cambridge
English barristers
English comedy writers
English game show hosts
English people of Scottish descent
English radio presenters
English television presenters
People from Stanmore
Members of the Middle Temple
People educated at Harrow High School
English television talk show hosts